Manilal Mohandas Gandhi (28 October 1892 – 5 April 1956) was the second son of Mohandas Gandhi and Kasturba Gandhi.

Biography
Manilal was born in Rajkot, British India, the second of four sons of Mohandas Gandhi and Kasturba Gandhi. He had an older brother, Harilal, and two younger brothers, Ramdas and Devdas. 

Manilal's early years were spent in Rajkot, and it was in 1897 he traveled to South Africa for the first time (his father having moved there several years previously). The family lived for a time in Durban and Johannesburg. Between 1906 and 1914, he lived at the Phoenix Settlement (in KwaZulu-Natal) and Tolstoy Farm (in Gauteng), both settlements established by his father.

After a brief visit to India (accompanying his parents), Manilal returned to South Africa in 1917 to assist in printing the Indian Opinion, a Gujarati-English weekly publication, at Phoenix, Durban. By 1918, Manilal was doing most of the work for the press, and in 1920, he took over as editor. He remained editor of Indian Opinion until 1956, the year of his death. Manilal died from a cerebral thrombosis following a stroke.

Like his father, Manilal was also sent to prison several times by the British colonial government after protesting against what he perceived as unjust laws. He was one of the initial 78 marchers to accompany Gandhi on the 1930 Salt March, for which he was imprisoned.

Personal life
In 1926, Manilal informed his father Mahatma Gandhi about Fatima Gool, with whom he had fallen in love in South Africa. Fatima was a Muslim of Gujrati descent. But Gandhi conveyed his disagreement and wrote:If you stick to Hinduism and Fatima follows Islam it will be like putting two swords in one sheath; or you both may lose your faith. And then what should be your children’s faith? ... It is not dharma, only adharma if Fatima agrees to conversion just for marrying you. Faith is not a thing like a garment which can be changed to suit our convenience.In 1927, Manilal married Sushila (24 August 1907 – 1988), a woman from his own community and similar background, in a match arranged by their families in the usual Indian way. Sushila was the daughter of Nanabhai Mashruwala of Akola, Bombay State, and the niece of Kishorlal Mashruwala, a close associate of Gandhiji and a resident of Sevagram ashram.  It was Mahatma Gandhi who sought her hand for his second son; the match was arranged, and after the wedding, Sushila duly joined her husband in South Africa. They had 3 children.
Sita (b. 1928), elder daughter
Arun Manilal Gandhi (b. 1934), son
Ela Gandhi Ramgobin (b. 1940), younger daughter

Legacy
Manilal's children Arun and Ela are also social-political activists. Uma D. Mesthrie, Sita's daughter, recently published a biography on Manilal.

Notes
 Mesthrie, Uma Dhupelia. Gandhi’s Prisoner? The Life of Gandhi’s Son Manilal. Permanent Black: Cape Town, South Africa, 2003. 
 Dhupelia-Mesthrie, Uma, "Writing the Life of Manilal Mohandas Gandhi," Journal of Natal and Zulu History 24 & 25 (2006-2007): 188-213.

References

External links 

Interview of Ela Gandhi
 The African Activist Archive Project website has an Interview with Manilal Gandhi conducted in South Africa in September 1954 by George M. Houser. At the time he was editor of newspaper Indian Opinion and ran the Phoenix Settlement, both established by his father. There is also a 1947 photograph of Manilal Gandhi at the Community Church of New York, a September 1954 photograph of Mr. and Mrs. Manilal Gandhi at Phoenix Settlement and a 1954 photograph of Chief Albert Luthuli and Manilal Gandhi. Four issues of the newsletter Bulletin: Americans for South African Resistance has information about him: September 1952 issue, the 14 January 1953 issue, the 27 February 1953 issue, and the 1 March 1954 issue.

1892 births
1956 deaths
Manilal
Gandhians
Anti-apartheid activists
People from Rajkot
Deaths from cerebral thrombosis
Prisoners and detainees of British India
South African Indian Congress politicians
South African people of Indian descent
South African people of Gujarati descent
Colony of Natal people
South African editors
People from Durban
Emigrants from British India to the Colony of Natal